George V. Cybenko is the Dorothy and Walter Gramm Professor of
Engineering at Dartmouth and a fellow of the IEEE and SIAM.

Education 

Cybenko obtained his BA in mathematics from the University of Toronto in 1974 and received his PhD from Princeton in applied mathematics of electrical and computer engineering in 1978 under Bede Liu.

Work 
Cybenko has served as an advisor for the Defense Science Board and several other government panels and is the founding editor-in-chief of the IEEE Security & Privacy magazine.
His current research interests are distributed information, control systems, and signal processing, with a focus on applications to security and infrastructure protection.
He is known for proving the universal approximation theorem for artificial neural networks with sigmoid activation functions.

Awards 
 SIAM Fellow (2020), "for contributions to theory and algorithms in signal processing, artificial neural networks, and distributed computing systems."
 SPIE Eric A. Lehrfeld Award (2016), for "work in cyber security including developing algorithms, analysis techniques, and tools to improve the state of the art in many areas, including computational behavior analysis, adversarial deception detection and dynamics, disclosure risk, and covert channels, and for his efforts in support of the SPIE Defense + Commercial Sensing symposium".
 US Air Force Commander’s Service Award (2016)
 IEEE Fellow (1998), "for contributions to algorithms and theory of artificial neural networks in signal processing, and to theory and systems software for distributed and parallel computing."

References

External links 
 Homepage at Dartmouth

American computer scientists
20th-century American mathematicians
21st-century American mathematicians
American electrical engineers
Princeton University School of Engineering and Applied Science alumni
Fellow Members of the IEEE
Living people
Dartmouth College faculty
Place of birth missing (living people)
Year of birth missing (living people)
Fellows of the Society for Industrial and Applied Mathematics
University of Toronto alumni